Novel & Short Story Writer's Market (NSSWM) is an annual resource guide for fiction writers that compiles hundreds of listings for book publishers, magazines, literary agents, writing contests, and conferences. NSSWM is published by Writer's Digest Books and usually hits bookstores around August of each year.

The Market Listings
For 26 years, NSSWM has listed hundreds of U.S. and international magazines and book publishers who are open to submissions from fiction writers. Listings provide current contact information, editorial needs, schedules, submission guidelines, and payment and contract terms. All listings are updated annually.

The Articles
In addition to the market listings, the book contains interviews with and essays by best-selling and award-winning writers, as well as editors and agents.

Writer's Digest Books
Novel & Short Story Writer's Market is one of eight "market books" published each year by Writer's Digest Books - the most famous of which is Writer's Market, a book that lists thousands of magazine and book publishers listings for writers. Others include: Photographer's Market, Children's Writer's and Illustrator's Market, Guide to Literary Agents, Artist and Graphic Designer's Market, Poet's Market and Songwriter's Market. Each book is designed to give creatives instructions on how to submit work for publication.

See also
 Publishing 
 Writer's Digest
 Writer's Market
 Writers' & Artists' Yearbook
 query
 royalties
 Authors Guild

External links
 Official site for the competitions of Writer's Digest Books
 Writer's Digest magazine official site
 F+W Publications - parent company of Writer's Digest Books

Directories